The Queen's Award for Forestry was awarded by Queen Elizabeth II to recognise outstanding contributions to forestry by a Commonwealth citizen nominated by the Commonwealth Forestry Association. The award recognises achievements and supports future work of an outstanding mid-career forester who combines exceptional contributions with an innovative approach to their work.

Recipients

Recipients - individuals
John Turnbull (1988)
SN Rai (1991)
Yemi Katerere (1993)
Thang Hooi Chiew (1996)
Jerome Vanclay (1997)
VK Bahuguna (2000)
Stephen Bass (2001)
Ravi Prabhu (2005)
Shashi Kant (2008)

External links

Commonwealth Forestry Association

International awards
Commonwealth of Nations
World forestry